The Aerosol Grey Machine is the debut studio album by English progressive rock band Van der Graaf Generator. It was first released in the United States in 1969 by Mercury Records.

Content 

The album was originally intended as a solo album by the band's lead singer and main songwriter, Peter Hammill. When the band signed with Charisma Records, a deal was worked out whereby The Aerosol Grey Machine would be released under the Van der Graaf Generator name, in return for Mercury releasing Hammill from his earlier contract.

Release 

The Aerosol Grey Machine was released in September 1969 by Mercury, in the US only. An initial edition contained the song "Giant Squid" on the cover but that was a mis-print (on the record "Necromancer" was featured instead), later pressings corrected the mis-print. This version of the LP was later released in Europe by Fontana Records.

The album was reissued on CD in 1997 by Repertoire Records in Germany, using the original running order of the album as released on LP, and featuring the first single as bonus tracks. Another 1997 release, by Peter Hammill's own UK record label FIE! Records, uses a slightly different running order and adds "Giant Squid" along with a previously unreleased early version of "Ferret and Featherbird" as bonus tracks.

Reception 

In his retrospective review, Steven McDonald of AllMusic called it "A raw, energetic effort that sometimes did little to show off the young Hammill's talents" that "nevertheless has some fine moments that hint at the possibilities for future releases". Paul Stump, in his 1997 History of Progressive Rock, commented that the album "said little unsaid elsewhere at the time; it was poetically skewed pop, arcanely arranged and cautiously extended."

Track listing

Personnel 
Van der Graaf Generator
 Peter Hammill – lead vocals, acoustic guitar
 Hugh Banton – Farfisa organ, piano, percussion, backing vocals,
 Keith Ellis – bass guitar
 Guy Evans – drums, percussion

 Additional personnel

 Jeff Peach – flute on "Running Back"
 Chris Judge Smith – slide-saxophone and harmony vocals on "People You Were Going To", chorus vocals on "Firebrand"

References

External links 
 The Aerosol Grey Machine at vandergraafgenerator.co.uk 
 Van der Graaf Generator - The Aerosol Grey Machine (1969) album review by Steven McDonald, credits & releases at AllMusic.com
 Van der Graaf Generator - The Aerosol Grey Machine (1969) album releases & credits at Discogs.com

Van der Graaf Generator albums
1969 debut albums
Fontana Records albums
Mercury Records albums
Repertoire Records albums
Vertigo Records albums
Albums produced by John Anthony (record producer)
Albums recorded at Trident Studios